Čalovec, formerly Mederč (Hungarian pronunciation:) is a village and municipality in the Komárno District in the Nitra Region of south-west Slovakia.

Geography
The village lies at an altitude of 112 metres and covers an area of 23.209 km².
It has a population of about 1,185 people.

History
In the 9th century, the territory of Čalovec became part of the Kingdom of Hungary. The village was first mentioned in 1268
After the Austro-Hungarian army disintegrated in November 1918, Czechoslovak troops occupied the area, later acknowledged internationally by the Treaty of Trianon. Between 1938 and 1945 Čalovec once more became part of Miklós Horthy's Hungary through the First Vienna Award. From 1945 until the Velvet Divorce, it was part of Czechoslovakia. Since then it has been part of Slovakia.

Demographics
The village is about 84% Hungarian,  16% Slovak.

Facilities
The village has a public library and a football pitch.

Genealogical resources

The records for genealogical research are available at the state archive "Statny Archiv in Nitra, Slovakia"

 Reformated church records (births/marriages/deaths): 1828-1900 (parish A)

See also
 List of municipalities and towns in Slovakia

References

External links
Surnames of living people in Calovec

Villages and municipalities in the Komárno District
Hungarian communities in Slovakia